Else Elster (22 February 1910 – 28 March 1998) was a German actress who appeared in over forty films during the Weimar and Nazi eras.

Selected filmography
 The Blonde Nightingale (1930)
 Weekend in Paradise (1931)
 Victoria and Her Hussar (1931)
 Death Over Shanghai (1932)
 Secret of the Blue Room (1932)
 Frederica (1932)
 The Escape to Nice (1932)
 The Cheeky Devil (1932)
 Mrs. Lehmann's Daughters (1932)
 Wedding at Lake Wolfgang (1933)
 Must We Get Divorced? (1933)
 Trouble Backstairs (1935)
 Make Me Happy (1935)
 The Violet of Potsdamer Platz (1936)
 Three Girls for Schubert (1936)
 The Stars Shine (1938)
 Hello Janine! (1939)
 The Unfaithful Eckehart (1940)
 Jud Süß (1940)
 Love is Duty Free (1941)
 Fritze Bollmann wollte angeln (1943)
 Nothing But Coincidence (1949)

Bibliography
 Rentschler, Eric. The Ministry of Illusion: Nazi Cinema and Its Afterlife. Harvard University Press, 1996.
 Weaver, Tom & Brunas, Michael & Brunas, John. Universal Horrors: The Studio's Classic Films, 1931-1946. McFarland & Company, 2007.

External links

Else Elster at Virtual History

1910 births
1998 deaths
German film actresses
Actresses from Gdańsk
People from West Prussia
20th-century German actresses